Bogdan Nikolaevich Rudenko (born September 13, 1977) is a Kazakhstani retired ice hockey player.

Career overview
Rudenko began his career playing hockey in Russia with Avangard Omsk, but he quickly moved to Canada, playing for the Kitchener Rangers, Kingston Frontenacs, and Sarnia Sting.  He then spent several seasons bouncing between various teams in the United Hockey League and the ECHL, before spending his final season with the Twin City Cyclones of the SPHL in 2008-2009. He also played for the Colorado Gold Kings in the WCHL as well as the Idaho Steelheads.

After Hockey
Rudenko was arrested in Colorado Springs, Colorado in allegedly connection with a murder near Charlotte, North Carolina, on December 25, 2009.  He allegedly shot his childhood hockey mate to death in an automotive shop in Stallings, North Carolina on or before December 20. In fact, he did not commit murder. On January 20, 2012, the Union County DA dropped the murder charge against Rudenko, clearing his name.

Career statistics

Notes

External links

1977 births
Living people
Sportspeople from Oskemen
Kazakhstani ice hockey right wingers
Avangard Omsk players
Kazzinc-Torpedo players
Kitchener Rangers players
Kingston Frontenacs players
Sarnia Sting players
Wheeling Nailers players
Quad City Mallards (UHL) players
Colorado Gold Kings players
Idaho Steelheads (WCHL) players
Asheville Smoke players
Columbus Cottonmouths (ECHL) players
Jackson Bandits players
Adirondack IceHawks players
Charlotte Checkers (1993–2010) players
Florida Everblades players
Pensacola Ice Pilots players
Fort Wayne Komets players
Flint Generals players
Twin City Cyclones players
Kazakhstani expatriate sportspeople in Canada
Kazakhstani expatriate sportspeople in the United States
Kazakhstani expatriate sportspeople in Russia
Expatriate ice hockey players in the United States
Expatriate ice hockey players in Russia
Expatriate ice hockey players in Canada
Kazakhstani expatriate ice hockey people